Marnardal is a former municipality in the old Vest-Agder county, Norway. It existed from 1964 until 2020 when it was merged into Lindesnes Municipality in what is now Agder county.  It was located in the traditional district of Sørlandet. The administrative centre of the municipality was the village of Heddeland. Other villages in Marnardal include Bjelland, Breland, Koland, Laudal, and Øyslebø.

The Sørlandet Railway Line runs through the municipality stopping at Breland Station and Marnardal Station.

At the time of its dissolution in 2020, the  municipality is the 240th largest by area out of the 422 municipalities in Norway. Marnardal is the 306th most populous municipality in Norway with a population of 2,309.

General information

Marnardal was established as a new municipality on 1 January 1964 through the merger of several municipalities. These areas that became Marnardal included all Bjelland municipality except for the Midtbø and Ågedal areas (population: 535), all of the municipality of Laudal, the Kleveland bru area of Finsland (population: 34), and all of Øyslebø municipality except for the Brunvatne area (population: 1,068).

On 1 January 2020, the three neighboring municipalities of Mandal, Marnardal, and Lindesnes were merged into one large municipality called Lindesnes with its administrative centre being the town of Mandal.

Name

The name of the municipality is a revival (from 1964) of the Old Norse name of the valley: Marnardalr. The first element is the genitive case of the river name Mǫrn (now called Mandalselva) and the last element is dalr meaning 'dale' or 'valley'. The meaning of the river name is unknown (maybe derived from marr which means 'sea').

Coat of arms
The coat of arms was granted on 19 June 1987 until the municipality was dissolved on 1 January 2020. The official blazon is "Vert, three pine cones in pall stems conjoined Or". This means the arms have a green field (background) and the charge is a pine cone. The pine cones have a tincture of Or which means it is commonly colored yellow, but if it is made out of metal, then gold is used. The green color in the field and the choice of pine cones on the arms symbolize the importance of the forests which cover areas of the municipality. There are three conjoined pine cones to represent each of the three former municipalities of Bjelland, Laudal, and Øyslebø which were merged into Marnardal in 1964. The arms were designed by Ulf Dreyer using an idea by Kjersti Tveit Nilsen.

Churches
The Church of Norway has three parishes within the municipality of Marnardal. It is part of the Mandal prosti (deanery) in the Diocese of Agder og Telemark.

Government
All municipalities in Norway, including Marnardal, are responsible for primary education (through 10th grade), outpatient health services, senior citizen services, unemployment and other social services, zoning, economic development, and municipal roads.  The municipality was governed by a municipal council of elected representatives, which in turn elected a mayor.  The municipality fell under the Kristiansand District Court and the Agder Court of Appeal.

Municipal council
The municipal council  of Marnardal was made up of 21 representatives that were elected to four year terms.  The party breakdown of the final municipal council was as follows:

Geography
Marnardal is an inland municipality which follows the Mandalselva river through the Mandalen valley. The municipality borders Evje og Hornnes municipality to the north in Aust-Agder county; Audnedal municipality to the west; Lindesnes, Mandal, and Søgne municipalities to the south; and Songdalen and Vennesla municipalities in the east.

Climate

References

External links
Municipal fact sheet from Statistics Norway 
 
 
 

 
Lindesnes
Former municipalities of Norway
1964 establishments in Norway
2020 disestablishments in Norway